The Commerce Secretary of Pakistan is the Federal Secretary for the Ministry of Commerce. The position holder is a BPS-22 grade officer, usually belonging to the Pakistan Administrative Service. The Commerce Secretary is considered to be a coveted position in the Government of Pakistan with various public sector entities under his charge including Trading Corporation of Pakistan (TCP), State Life Insurance Corporation (SLIC), Trade Development Authority (TDAP) and National Insurance Corporation Limited (NICL). The position holder is a BPS-22 grade officer, usually belonging to the Pakistan Administrative Service. The current Commerce Secretary is Muhammad Sualeh Ahmad Faruqi.

Other organisations under the administrative control of the Commerce Secretary include Pakistan Reinsurance Company Limited (PRCL), Pakistan Tobacco Board (PTB) and Pakistan Tariff Commission (PTC).

See also
Government of Pakistan
Federal Secretary
Interior Secretary of Pakistan
Cabinet Secretary of Pakistan
Finance Secretary of Pakistan
Petroleum Secretary of Pakistan
Ministry of Commerce and Textile Industry
Trading Corporation of Pakistan

References

Ministry of Commerce (Pakistan)